Thomas B. Smith may refer to:
 Thomas B. Smith (mayor), American politician, mayor of Philadelphia, Pennsylvania, 1916–1920
 Thomas Barlow Smith (1839–1933), Canadian politician
 Thomas Benton Smith (1838–1923), Confederate States Army general
 Thomas Buckingham Smith (1810–1871), American lawyer
 Thomas B. Smith (conservation biologist), American evolutionary and conservation biologist

See also
 Thomas Smith (disambiguation)